Hayden Taylor Lindley (born 2 September 2002) is an English footballer who currently plays as a midfielder for Premier League club Aston Villa. Lindley is a product of the Aston Villa Academy and was also on the books of Manchester City and Blackburn Rovers as a junior.

Career

Early career
After impressing for the under-eights team of local side Honley Junior Football Club, Lindley joined the youth setup at Blackburn Rovers in October 2008. Soon after, he also began training with Manchester City's academy at a site in Bradford. Lindley was also approached by Leeds United but did not join them. Lindley remained with City until July 2019, when he departed to join Aston Villa.

Aston Villa
On 8 January 2021, Lindley made his first team debut for Aston Villa as a substitute in a FA Cup third round tie against Liverpool, after Villa had been forced to name a team of inexperienced academy players following a large amount of positive COVID-19 tests affected the first team.

On 24 May 2021, Lindley was part of the Aston Villa U18s team that won the FA Youth Cup, beating Liverpool U18s 2–1 in the final.

On 7 July 2021, he was one of several young players who signed a new contract with Aston Villa. Lindley again appeared for the first team on 24 August 2021 in Villa's away EFL Cup victory at Barrow, coming off the bench in the second half as a substitute for Frédéric Guilbert.

On 1 September 2022, Lindley joined Newport County on loan for the remainder of the 2022-23 season. He made his debut for Newport on the 13 September 2022 as a second half substitute in a 1–0 League Two defeat to Stevenage. On 29 December 2022, it was announced that Lindley would return to Villa on 1 January, after only making 5 league appearances for Newport in the first half of the season.

Career statistics

Notes

Honours 
Aston Villa U18s
 FA Youth Cup: 2020–21

References

External links
AVFC Profile

2002 births
Living people
Footballers from Huddersfield
English footballers
Association football midfielders
English Football League players
Aston Villa F.C. players
Newport County A.F.C. players